Zeng Baosun or Tseng Pao Swen (9 March 1893 – 27 July 1978) was a Chinese feminist, historian, and Christian educator.

Biography
Zeng was born into a prominent family in Xiangxiang, Hunan Province, and was the great-granddaughter of Zeng Guofan, a Qing dynasty Chinese official who commanded the Xiang Army during the Taiping Rebellion. Her feet were not bound and there was no early, arranged marriage.

At the age of 14, she studied at a girls' school in Shanghai before entering the Hangzhou Women's Normal School. Zeng converted to Christianity while studying an Anglican church school, Mary Vaughan High School, which she entered in 1910. She then attended Blackheath High School in London, before entering Westfield College, graduating with a bachelor's degree in 1916, thus becoming the first Chinese woman to receive the "Bachelor of Science degree with honors" from this college. Zeng often attended the Quaker meeting at Hampstead during her time at Westfield. She received teacher's training while at Oxford University and Cambridge University.

Zeng founded I Fang Girls' Collegiate School in Changsha. She left China in 1949 to settle in Taiwan. In 1953, she represented the Republic of China in the United Nations Commission on the Status of Women. Self-described in her memoir as a "Confucian feminist", Zeng published her autobiography as well as women's issues essays. She served on the Board of Directors of Donghai University in Taichung.

She died in Taiwan and was buried at No. 1 Public Cemetery in Taipei.

Works

References

1893 births
1978 deaths
Tunghai University
Chinese feminists
Republic of China historians
Chinese women writers
Women memoirists
Chinese women essayists
Alumni of Westfield College
Educators from Hunan
Alumni of the University of Oxford
Alumni of the University of Cambridge
People from Xiangxiang
People educated at Blackheath High School
Taiwanese educators
Republic of China essayists
Historians from Hunan
20th-century women writers
20th-century Chinese historians
20th-century essayists